Igud HaRabonim (Rabbinical Alliance of America) is a right-wing national rabbinical organization, with over 800 members 
across North America. Founded in 1942, it has for years received publicity from Rabbi Sholom Klass and The Jewish Press.

The organization has an active beth din (rabbinical court) in the greater New York City metropolitan area. Just like any other binding arbitration, its decisions are binding in civil courts if the litigants agree to appoint the beth din to arbitrate their dispute.

The organization's first president and co-founder was Rabbi Dr. Samuel A. Turk. Rabbi Gershon Tannenbaum served as director. Rabbi Abraham Hecht (1922-2013) served as President until his passing in 2013. Rabbi Yaakov Spivak served as a member of the Presidium until his passing in 2021.

Officers
Current officers are:
 Rabbi Yehoshua S. Hecht, Rabbi Yaakov Klass and Rabbi Hanania Elbaz - Presidium
 Rabbi Mendy Mirocznik, Executive Vice President
 Rabbi Moish Schmerler, Administrative Director
 Rabbi Avraham Amar, Menahel of Igud Israel
 Rabbi Aaron Glatt, MD, Director of Halacha and Medicine Commission
 Rabbi Gil Student, Director of Halacah Commission
 Rabbi Joseph Frager, MD, Chairman, Israel Advocacy Commission
 Rabbi Joseph Salamon, Senior Vice President
Members of the Beis Din are:
 Rabbi Hershel Kurzrock, Av Beis Din
 Rabbi Peretz Steinberg, Sgan Av Beis Din
 Rabbi Yaakov Shulman, Dayan
 Rabbi Laibel Wulliger, Moreh Tzedek
 Rabbi Yehoshua Grunwald, Dayan
 Rabbi Yitzchock Meir Pesach, Dayan
 Rabbi Avrohom Yehoshua Kirsch, Menahel Beis Din
 Rabbi Moshe Brody, Dayan, Dayan

References

External links
Official website
Beit Din website

Jewish courts and civil law
Orthodox rabbis
Jewish organizations based in the United States
Jewish organizations established in 1942
1942 establishments in New York (state)